The Musicians Hall of Fame and Museum (MHOF) in Nashville honors all musicians regardless of genre or instrument. The MHOF timeline starts with the beginning of recorded music and inductees are nominated by current members of the American Federation of Musicians and by other music industry professionals.

First museum
The museum first opened June 6, 2006 at 301 6th Ave. S., Nashville, Tennessee Exhibits consisted of instruments owned and played by well-known artists as well as behind-the-scenes session musicians.  These musicians were often the house studio musicians in cities such as Memphis, Los Angeles, Detroit, Nashville, Muscle Shoals and New York City.  These musicians were often the unsung heroes behind the hits of many great artists. These relatively small groups of players often recorded the majority of hits in the 1950s, 1960s, 1970s and 1980s.

Honors
The museum was voted venue of the year by the Meeting Professionals International in 2008.

Inductees

2007 (1st Annual) 
The Funk Brothers
The Nashville A-Team
The Wrecking Crew 
The Blue Moon Boys, The Memphis Boys
The Tennessee Two 
The inaugural ceremony was highlighted by the performances of Garth Brooks, Vince Gill, Peter Frampton, George Jones, Amy Grant, Rodney Crowell, B.J. Thomas, and Dobie Gray honoring the evenings inductees.

2008 (2nd Annual) 
Billy Sherrill
The Crickets
Al Kooper
Duane Eddy 
The Memphis Horns
Booker T. & the M.G.'s
The Muscle Shoals Rhythm Section & Friends
Keith Richards, Kid Rock, Phil Everly and Lee Ann Womack were among the performers to welcome the inductees. Richards joined The Crickets on stage for a performance of Holly's "Not Fade Away", which The Rolling Stones covered in 1964.

2009 (3rd Annual) 
Chet Atkins
Toto
Victor Feldman
Charlie Daniels
Fred Foster
Billy Cox
Paul Riser
Dick Dale

2014 (4th Annual)
After a four-year absence due to relocating, the 2014 Induction Ceremony was held in their new location on January 28, 2014.  
Barbara Mandrell
Peter Frampton
Randy Bachman
Stevie Ray Vaughan and Double Trouble 
Corki Casey O'Dell 
Velma Smith
Will Lee
Ben Keith 
Jimmy Capps (musician)
Buddy Guy
Mike Curb
Roy Orbison was also honored with a special posthumous honor – the 2014 "iconic riff" award for the famous guitar lick in his hit "Pretty Woman".

2016 (5th Annual)
Musicians Hall of Fame held its 5th annual Induction Ceremony and Concert. 
Garth Brooks and his studio musicians The G-Men
Studio musicians from Sigma Sound Studio in Philadelphia 
"Iconic Riff" winner Don Felder formerly with the Eagles for "Hotel California"
Ricky Skaggs 
Jerry Reed (posthumously) 
Producer Allen Reynolds
Engineers Lou Bradley, Ron 'Snake' Reynolds, Joe Tarsia, and Mark Miller. 
Special guests included: Kenny G, Bruce Hornsby, Steve Wariner, Russell Thompkins Jr. and Peter Frampton.

2019 (6th Annual) 
The Musicians Hall of Fame held its 6th Induction Concert and Ceremony on October 22, 2019 at the Schermerhorn Symphony Center. 
Bob Taylor of Taylor Guitars
Eddie Bayers
Paul Franklin
John Hobbs 
Brent Mason
Michael Rhodes of The Players
Owen Bradley
Bob Berryhill 
Pat Connolly
Drummers Jim Fuller and Ron Wilson of The Surfaris
David Briggs
Jerry Carrigan
Norbert Putnam
Terry Thompson, Earl Peanutt Montgomery, Joe South, and Reggie Young of the Original Muscle Shoals Rhythm Section
Harrison Calloway, Ronnie Eades, Charles Rose, and Harvey Thompson of the Muscle Shoals Horns
Don Everly of the Everly Brothers
Record engineer Billy Sharrill
Jeff Cook, Teddy Gentry, and Randy Owen of Alabama 
Felix Cavaliere of The Rascals
Steve Wariner
The Induction Ceremony was hosted by Paul Shaffer. Guest performers included: Jason Aldean, Mandy Barnett, Garth Brooks, Kix Brooks, Zac Brown, Ronnie Dunn, Mike Farris, Vince Gill, Emmylou Harris, Keb' Mo', and Ricky Skaggs.

2022 (7th Annual) 
The Musicians Hall of Fame held its 7th Induction Concert and Ceremony on November 20, 2022 at the Nashville Municipal Auditorium
Don McLean
Marty Stuart and The Fabulous Superlatives
Ray Stevens 
George Massenburg
James William Guercio 
Vince Gill
The Induction Ceremony was hosted by Phil Vassar. Guest performers including: Rodney Crowell, Steve Miller, Wendy Moten and Mike Farris. The Special performer performances Linda Chambers, executive vice president & chief operating officer.

Closing and reopening 
In February 2010, under the rules of eminent domain, the city of Nashville purchased the MHOF property in order to make room for the Music City Center (new convention center). On August 29, 2013 the MHOF reopened on the first floor of the historic Nashville Municipal Auditorium just off the James Robertson Parkway exit at 401 Gay Street, Nashville, TN 37219. The 200,000 square foot building houses the historic 10,000 seat Municipal Auditorium. The 68,000 sq. ft. exhibit floor, which was also Nashville's first convention center, will now house the museums artifacts and museum.

See also
 List of music museums

Notes

References

External links
 
 Joe Chambers Interview NAMM Oral History Library (2018)

Music halls of fame
Halls of fame in Tennessee
Music museums in Tennessee
Museums in Nashville, Tennessee
Arts organizations established in 2006
2006 establishments in Tennessee
Culture of Nashville, Tennessee
American Federation of Musicians